Bansdroni is a locality of South Kolkata in West Bengal, India. The area is under Kolkata Municipal Corporation & it comes under Kolkata Police jurisdiction.

History 
Bansdroni is a place of Art & culture. The place used to be a port during the 17th century when the Adi Ganga was the main flow of the Ganges into the sea Bay of Bengal. It was the gateway to a vast hinterland in South 24 Parganas. Bansdroni takes its name from 'Bangsho Dron' meaning a bamboo forest.

Geography

Police district
Bansdroni police station is in the South Suburban division of Kolkata Police. It is located at Rainagar Health Centre, Madhyapara, Bansdroni, Kolkata-700070.

Patuli Women police station has jurisdiction over all police districts under the jurisdiction of South Suburban Division i.e. Netaji Nagar, Jadavpur, Kasba, Regent Park, Bansdroni, Garfa and Patuli.

Jadavpur, Thakurpukur, Behala, Purba Jadavpur, Tiljala, Regent Park, Metiabruz, Nadial and Kasba police stations were transferred from South 24 Parganas to Kolkata in 2011. Except Metiabruz, all the police stations were split into two. The new police stations are Parnasree, Haridevpur, Garfa, Patuli, Survey Park, Pragati Maidan, Bansdroni and Rajabagan.

Location
The area is mainly a residential area, with nearly every building a residential one. The Usha Fan Factory is located here, However it closed down long ago due to labour unrest Vidyasagar Park (1 to 12) Lane is an important locality here. Now, Bansdroni houses important retail stores like Reliance Digital, Spencers, LG Shoppe, Max Fashions, Cafe Coffee Day, Bata, Khadims, Elite, Leather Line, Sparsh Diagnostic Centre and others. This area verges the Bansdroni & Netaji Nagar Police Stations. Subhash Park, Rifle Club, Jaysree, Dinesh Palli, Congress Nagar, Ananda Pally (East), Subodh Garden, Postal Park, Beltala Road (Postal Park), Chirantani Park, Arobindo park, Rania are important localities. Reputable fresh vegetable, fruits & fishes market/ bazaar are also found here.

Nearby
Bansdroni is close to Garia, Naktala , Ranikuthi and Tollygunge all on the main Netaji Subhash Chandra Bose Road.

Transport
The place is connected to the city with the Netaji Subhash Chandra Bose Road linking Naktala and Garia in the south-east and Tollygunge in the south-west. The Kolkata Metro touches Bansdroni at the Masterda Surya Sen metro station. Suitable Communication like AC Bus (AC6), CSTC Buses (S6A, S7), Private Buses (80A, 205, 205A, 228, SD5), Naktala - Howrah Mini Bus, Harinavi - Howrah Mini Bus etc. and frequent auto services are also available here in all time.
It is also connected with Garia and Tollygunge through Auto service.
Bansdroni to Brahmapur Auto service is also available.

Education
Education is parted via schools such as The Assembly of God Church School (Tollygunj Branch), Future Foundation, G.D. Birla, Maharishi Vidya Mandir, Holy Home, Adarsh English High School, B.D. Memorial (Primary), St.Mary's Church School and De Paul (the last two being catholic). Some oldest boys & girls schools namely Khanpur Hirendralal Sarkar high school (Boys), Khanpur Nirmala Bala (Girls) high school, Bansdroni Binoy Balika Vidyalaya, Binoy Pally Adarsha Bidya Mandir, Chakdaha Boys & Girls HS Schools, St. Clare School, Muktadhara (Nursery & Primary School), Little Star (Nursery & Primary School) are also situated in the Bansdroni Park/ Postal Park Area. For dance, acting, arts & crafts enthusiasts also there is Mermaid Film Academy, an internationally recognised dance school in Bansdroni.

Culture
The Shiva Temple holds prominent place here. There is also a church named Queen of Peace Church.There is also a kali temple which is popularly known as Kali bari Kali temple.

Legendary Indian Actor Shri Chhabi Biswas used to reside in Bansdroni. He was primarily known for his performances in Tapan Sinha's Kabuliwala and Satyajit Ray's films Jalshaghar (The Music Room, 1958), Devi, (The Goddess, 1960) and Kanchenjungha (1962).
Veteran Indian Bollywood singer, composer, actor, and record producer-Alokesh "Bappi" Lahiri used to reside in Bansdroni.
Among the Legendary personalities, Kanan Devi (22 April 1916 – 17 July 1992) an Indian actress and singer lived in Bansdroni. She was among the early singing stars of Indian cinema and is credited popularly as the first star of Bengali cinema. Her singing style, usually in rapid tempo, was used instrumentally in some of the biggest hits of New Theatres, Kolkata.
Legendary Lyricist: Shri Shibdas Banerjee also lived in Bansdroni, he composed songs for Bharat Ratna Lata Mangeshkar, Bharat Ratna Bhupen Hazarika.
Bollywood Playback singer Ujjaini Mukherjee has roots in Bansdroni.
Zee Bangla Sa Re Ga Ma Pa season 2014 famed contestant and Colors Bangla Great Music Gurukul 2015 Runners Up Tamojit Dasgupta also reside in Bansdroni.

Till date the place Bansdroni is carrying the legacy to host the huge number of cultural music concerts. Most of the Tollywood & Bollywood celebrities have performed in the Cultural Programs of Bansdroni area. The dwellers of Bansdroni are music concert lovers & very artistic in nature. With time the place have become crowded, now population of Bansdroni have increased than previous.

References

Neighbourhoods in Kolkata